Luis Antonio Jaime of Spain (25 July 1727 – 7 August 1785), Infante of Spain, Cardinal Deacon of the titular church of Santa Maria della Scala in Rome, Archbishop of Toledo and Primate of Spain, 13th Count of Chinchón, Grandee of Spain First Class, known as the Cardinal Infante, was a son of Philip V, King of Spain and his second wife, Elisabeth Farnese.

He is listed in the Guinness Book of World Records as the youngest-ever cardinal.

Life

Early years 
Luis Antonio Jaime de Borbón y Farnesio was born the youngest son of Philip V, King of Spain, and his second wife, Elisabeth Farnese. While barely eight years of age, Luis was created 699th Knight of the Order of the Golden Fleece in 1735 and ordained Archbishop of Toledo and Primate of Spain on 9 September 1735, and subsequently named Cardinal-Priest of the Title of the church of Santa Maria della Scala (pro hac vice) in Rome on 19 December. On 18 December 1754 he abandoned the ecclesiastical life for lack of vocation, renounced his ecclesiastical titles and dignities and assumed the title of 13th Conde de Chinchón (Count of Chinchón) granted by his brother Infante Felipe.

When his older half-brother King Ferdinand VI died without issue in 1759, Luis claimed the throne on the grounds that, he was the only surviving son of Philip V still residing in Spain (his older brothers were Charles, King of Naples and Sicily, and Philip, Duke of Parma, both reigning in Italy). However valid his claim, Luis lost the succession to his oldest brother Charles, while Charles's
third son became Ferdinand I of the Two Sicilies.

Infante Luis was a patron of the arts and culture, and admirer of musician Luigi Boccherini, architect Ventura Rodríguez and painters Francisco de Goya, Luis Paret y Alcázar, and Charles Joseph Flipart.

Marriage

King Charles III, fearful of his brother, exiled Luis far away from the Court of Madrid. In 1776 at Olias del Rey Luis contracted a morganatic marriage with an Aragonese aristocrat, María Teresa de Vallabriga. This was much to the liking of Charles, because Luis now could not have children with a better claim to the throne.

Children
Since Luis's children had been born of a morganatic marriage, they could not receive royal titles, and thus the descendants of Charles were the legitimate Spanish heirs (even though the children of Charles had been born in Naples). The couple had four children:
 Luis María de Borbón y Vallabriga, 14th Count of Chinchón (Cadalso de los Vidrios, 1777 – Madrid, 1823);
 a stillborn;
 María Teresa de Borbón y Vallabriga, 15th Countess of Chinchón; married in the Escorial, Madrid, 2 October 1797 Manuel de Godoy y Álvarez de Faria, 1st Principe de la Paz, 1st Duque de Alcúdia and 1st Duque de Sueca (Badajoz, 12 May 1767 – Paris, 4 October 1851), and had issue, an only daughter Carlota Luisa Manuela.
 María Luisa de Borbón y Vallabriga (Toledo, 21 March 1780 – Paris, 1 December 1846), 98th Noble Dame of the Royal Order of Queen María Luisa on 10 October 1800, married in 1817 Joaquín José de Melgarejo y Saurín, de Rojas y Ruíz-Dávalos (Cox, Alicante, 23 January 1780 – Madrid, 9 April 1835), 3rd Marqués de Melgarejo and 1st Duke of San Fernando de Quiroga Grandee of Spain First Class with a Coat of Arms of de Melgarejo, 39th Minister of External Affairs of Spain (12 September 1819 – 18 March 1820), without issue. She is the last surviving grandchild of Philip V of Spain.

Charles had a great deal of appreciation and devotion to his younger brother, and even during his exile, Luis was treated quite well by the Spanish court. Luis loved his brother equally as much, which is why Luis later accepted Charles as king and accepted his exile. Despite this, Luis remained bitter and saddened by the fact that he lost the opportunity to be king. Luis died disgraced and in internal exile in 1785.

Ancestors

References

18th-century Spanish cardinals
Archbishops of Toledo
1727 births
1785 deaths
House of Bourbon (Spain)
Grandees of Spain
Spanish infantes
Spanish royalty
Luis 13
Knights of the Golden Fleece of Spain
Burials in the Pantheon of Infantes at El Escorial
18th-century Roman Catholic archbishops in Spain
Resigned cardinals
Sons of kings